Vehicle registration plates of Poland indicate the region of registration of the vehicle given the number plate.

According to Polish law, the registration plate is tied to the vehicle, not the owner. There is no possibility for the owner to keep the licence number for use on a different car, even if it's a cherished registration. The licence plates are issued by the powiat (county) of the vehicle owner's registered address of residence, in the case of a natural person. If it is owned by a legal person, the place of registration is determined by his/her address. Vehicles leased under operating leases and many de facto finance leases will be registered at the address of the lessor. When a vehicle changes hands, the new owner must apply for new vehicle registration document bearing his or her name and registered address. The new owner may obtain a new licence plate although it is not necessary when the new owner's residence address is in the same district as the previous owner's. In such a situation the licence plates are usually carried over to the new owner, because the change carries an additional cost. Upon purchasing a vehicle from another person, if the vehicle has an EU plate, the new owner must replace it with a registration for their address and area, and give the EU plate to their powiat licensing authority to free up numbers in the future. If the car has a plate dated before May 1, 2006, the owner is free to do whatever they wish with it, as long as it is legal under Polish law. The plaque cannot be replaced if destroyed. The change of the whole set is required.

The change in system shown below in 2001 is related to the reduction in the previous year of the number of voivodeships in Poland from 49 to 16, based on the country's historic regions. The pre-2001 licence plates (white letters on black background) can be used indefinitely, but since they are obsolete they have to be replaced in case of change of vehicle's ownership.

In the pre-2001 model, there were not sufficient letters in the Polish alphabet for each of the old voivodeships to have a single letter. Only the standard latin alphabet was used (excluding Q), and the specific Polish characters with diacritics were excluded in order to make the plates fully internationally readable. Therefore, two letters had to be used to indicate the vehicle's origin (the middle administrative level of powiat was not introduced until 1999). Since the change, the first letter has always denoted the new voivodeship. One additional letter is used in cities with rights of powiat (this applies to 47 of 49 capitals of the old voivodeships, the exceptions being Ciechanów and Sieradz, and numerous major cities). Two additional letters are used in any other powiat.

It is not necessary for EU citizens to immediately re-register the vehicles they have brought with them if they are duly registered and taxed elsewhere in the EU, when living in Poland. This emerges from European law, although local regulations have to date not been changed to reflect the law, leading to officials locally sometimes giving incorrect advice on this point. If in doubt, refer to your Embassy.

Format

Stickers and security measures

The licence plates are invalid without the two adhesive stickers with a hologram placed on the license plates, and an adhesive plaque bearing the same number as the plates on the inside of windshield. If the vehicle uses only one licence plate the second sticker must be attached to the registration papers.

Licence plate types and combinations
Each powiat uses a unique two or three letter code, with the first letter denoting the powiat's voivodeship. The number pools listed below are not used in any particular order, although one pool is usually depleted before the next one is used. A visible gap exists between the area code and series, but there is no possibility of confusion if the number is written down without it. 

The following characters are used in licence plate examples: 
 X – voivodeship code
 XY, XYZ – powiat code
 J, K, L – any allowed letter
 digits

The letters used in licence plates include all standard Latin alphabet letters outside of Q (not used at all in the Polish language). The letters B, D, I, O, and Z cannot be used in series area (on the right, after the gap), because they can be confused with digits. Only custom plates can include these letters, including letter Q, not existing in the Polish alphabet. The leading 0 in numbers is never omitted.

Cars, trucks, and buses
Format:
 XY 12345
 XY 1234J
 XY 123JK
 XY 1J345
 XY 1JK45 
 XYZ J234
 XYZ 12JK
 XYZ 1J34 (first digit cannot be 0)
 XYZ 12J4 (last digit cannot be 0)
 XYZ 1JK4 (neither digit can be 0)
 XYZ JK34
 XYZ 12345
 XYZ 1234J
 XYZ 123JK

The number of available unique numbers with these mentioned formats is 1,100,000 for each two-letter powiat code, and 872,400 for each three-letter powiat code. Note that the combinations "XYZ 1234" and "XYZ 123J" are not used, because they would lead to creation of numbers identical to these in the old system. Also, the two-letter powiat codes must be followed by a leading digit, "XY 1...", to avoid confusion with the "XYZ ..." scheme, as the gap is not significant. Electric vehicles have green background on their license plates.

Motorcycles, mopeds, and agricultural vehicles

Format:
 XY 1234
 XY 123J
 XY 1J34 (first digit cannot be 0)
 XY 12J4 (last digit cannot be 0)
 XY 12JK
 XY JK12
 XYZ J234
 XYZ 12JK
 XYZ 1J34 (first digit cannot be 0)
 XYZ 12J4 (last digit cannot be 0)
 XYZ 1JK4 (neither digit can be 0)
 XYZ JK34
 XYZ J23K
 XYZ J2KL (a digit cannot be 0)

Cars – reduced size

Format:

 X 123
 X 12J
 X 1J2
 X J12
 X 1JK
 X JK1
 X J1K

The plates are designed for cars from USA. Reduced size plates are the same width as US plates.

Classic cars

Format:
 XY 12J
 XY 123
 XYZ 1J
 XYZ 12
 XYZ J1

These plates use black text on a yellow background with an additional picture of a vintage car on the right side. Only cars older than 25 years, out of production for 15 years and containing at least 75% of original parts are eligible to be registered as classic cars, with an exception of prototypes that were never produced, cars of considerable historical value or "being an example  of original or important technological solutions". These plates are issued on a case by case rules.

Temporary and export plates

Format:
 X1 2345
 X1 234J

These plates use red text on a white background. The plates wear a seal with month and year of validation. The windshield plaque is not issued with it.

Electric car plates

Introduced on 1 January 2020, they are issued to battery-electric and hydrogen vehicles. They are similar to regular plates but the background colour is light green instead of white.

Testing vehicles

Format:
 X1 234 B

These plates use red text on a white background. The windshield plaque is not issued with it. The last character is always the letter B (B stands for badawcza, which translates to "testing type"). Only car manufacturers and automobile R&D centres are issued these plates.

Custom plates

Format:
 X1 JKLMN

These plates use standard black letters on a white background. Each custom number starts with the letter denoting voivodeship and a single digit, followed by the gap. This digit and next characters can be picked by the owner. Outside the availability the following constrains are used: 
 after the gap between 3 and 5 characters can be used
 the first character must be a letter
 no more than 2 last characters can be digits
 all letters come before digits (i.e. they cannot be intermixed)
 any standard Latin letter outside Q can be used (unlike common licence plates)
 resulting plate must not contain or resemble offensive contents

Professional plates
Format:
 X12 34P56 (second letter is always "P")

Since July 2019 car dealers of new cars can apply for special number plates with green letters on white background specifically for doing test drives. Those plates are issued exclusively for the company itself and not for a specific car which means that those plates can be applied to multiple vehicles at once. Only car retailers can obtain one and such cars can be driven only by the car dealer, owner of the company, his employees or by the customers but only while being accompanied by car dealership owner or his worker.

Diplomatic plates

Format:
 X 123456

White symbols on blue background. First three digits indicate country or organization.

Table of codes:

Service plates

Format:
 H#J K234
 H#J 12KL
Vehicles utilised used by the Polish Ministry of Internal Affairs and Administration use licence plates beginning with "H", instead of the voivodeship code. The second letter denotes the service, for example "HP" is used by the Polish Police. Any standard Latin letter outside Q can be used (unlike common licence plates). These services are also allowed to use common licence plates.

Codes:
HA# – Central Bureau of Anticorruption
HB# – Government Protection Bureau
HC# – Customs Service
HK# – Internal Security Agency, Foreign Intelligence Agency
HM# – Military Counterintelligence Agency, Military Intelligence Agency
HP# – Police
HS# – Fiscal Control
HW# – Border Guard

Military plates

Format:
 U# 12345
 UC 1234T
 UK 1234
The Polish military uses licence plates beginning with "U" instead of the voivodeship code. The following letter denotes the usage of the vehicle. For example, military trucks have licence plates beginning with "UC". The trailing T in the number denotes a tracked vehicle. The military are not obliged to use the standard licence plates on tracked vehicles, armoured cars and armoured personnel carriers — they can be painted on the vehicle itself or applied as a sticker.

Codes:
UA# – Cars, offroad vehicles and specialistic vehicles based on cars or off-roaders
UB# – Armoured personnel carriers
UC# – Military trucks
UD# – Buses
UE# – Trucks
UG# – Special trucks
UI# – Transport trailers
UJ# – Special trailers
UK# – Motorcycles

Cost of purchasing registration plates
 Regular: 80 PLN
 Motorcycles: 40 PLN
 Mopeds: 30 PLN
 Custom Regular: 1000 PLN
 Custom Motorcycles: 500 PLN
 Classic Cars: 100 PLN
 Temporary: 30 PLN

District indicators

History

1922–1937 
From July 1922 Polish car number plates had two letters denoting voivodeship (being an abbreviation of its name), or single letter W denoting capital city of Warsaw, and up to five digits. Except for letter identifier, each voivodeship had own range of numbers (except for autonomic Silesian Voivodeship, which used ŚL identifier and own numbers from 1). Plates were white, with red letters and black digits, separated with red dash. 
  
There were also temporary plates with PR letters and presidential plates with WZK letters (for President of Poland chancellery). Military plates had only four white digits on black background.

1937–1939 
From 1937 there was a new different system of registration numbers introduced, with white letters on black plates. There was one letter denoting vehicle type, two-digit number denoting voivodeship, and three-digit individual number after a dash. Letters A, B, C, D, E, H, K, L, X, Y, Z were used for cars, trucks and buses, T for taxicabs, M, N, P, R, S, U for motorcycles and W for military vehicles. A range of numbers 00 to 19 meant capital city of Warsaw, 20 to 24 indicated Białostok Voivodeship, and so on, in alphabetical order, up to 95 to 99 for Wołyńskie Voivodeship.

During World War II there were plates introduced by occupants.

1944–1956 
From 1946 Polish car number plates had the LNN-NNN format, with L being a letter and N being a digit. The full name of the province was located at the bottom.

1956–1976 

From June 19, 1956, Polish car number plates had 2 letters and 4 digits, and after May 13, 1964, letters could stand after digits.

Individual elements meant:
 first letter: code of voivodeship,
 second letter: code of powiat,
 digits: code of vehicle.

Codes of voivodeships:
 A – Białystok Voivodeship
 B – Bydgoszcz Voivodeship
 C – Kielce Voivodeship
 E – Koszalin Voivodeship
 F – Łódź Voivodeship
 G – Gdańsk Voivodeship
 H – Opole Voivodeship
 I – city of Łódź
 K – Kraków Voivodeship
 L – Lublin Voivodeship
 M – Szczecin Voivodeship
 O – Olsztyn Voivodeship
 P – Poznań Voivodeship
 R – Rzeszów Voivodeship
 S – Katowice Voivodeship
 T – Warsaw Voivodeship
 W – capital city of Warsaw
 X – Wrocław Voivodeship
 Z – Zielona Góra Voivodeship

Codes of special forces:
 Y – Citizen's Militia
 D – army (cars)
 U – army (other vehicles)
 N – Border Guard

1976–2000 

Plates from the 1976–2000 series are still valid. They have white letters on black background. The coding used was three letters and four digits (XYZ 1234) or three letters, three digits and one letter (XYZ 123A), although at the beginning the configuration with a letter in the end was used for public cars only.

The following coding was used for the 49 regions of the country:

Biała Podlaska: BP, BA, BS 
Białystok: BK, BT, BI 
Bielsko-Biała: BB, BL, BO 
Bydgoszcz: BY, BG, BD, BC 
Chełm: CH, CM, CU 
Ciechanów: CI, CN, CA
Częstochowa: CZ, CE, CO 
Elbląg: EL, EG, EB 
Gdańsk: GD, GK, GA, GN 
Gorzów Wlkp.: GO, GW, GR 
Jelenia Góra: JG, JE, JA
Kalisz: KL, KZ, KP 
Katowice: KA, KT, KB, KC, KD, KX
Kielce: KI, KE, KJ 
Konin: KN, KM, KF 
Koszalin: KO, KG, KY 
Kraków (Cracow): KR, KK, KW, KV
Krosno: KS, KU, KH 
Legnica: LG, LC, LI 
Leszno: LE, LS, LN 
Lublin: LU, LL, LB 
Łomża: LO, LM, LA 
Łódź: LD, LZ, LF, LW 
Nowy Sącz: NS, NO, NA 
Olsztyn: OL, ON, OT
Opole: OP, OE, OD 
Ostrołęka: OS, OK, OR
Piła: PI, PA, PY 
Piotrków Tryb.: PT, PK, PU
Płock: PL, PC, PB 
Poznań: PO, PN, PZ, PW
Przemyśl: PR, PM, PE 
Radom: RA, RO, RD 
Rzeszów: RZ, RE, RW 
Siedlce: SE, SD, ST 
Sieradz: SI, SA, SB 
Skierniewice: SK, SN, SF
Słupsk: SL, SP, SG 
Suwałki: SU, SW, SO
Szczecin: SZ, SC, SM 
Tarnobrzeg: TG, TB, TE 
Tarnów: TA, TN, TW 
Toruń: TO, TU, TY
Wałbrzych: WB, WY, WH 
Warsaw: WA, WS, WI, WU, WG, WF, WX, WZ, WM, WT, WP, WV
Włocławek: WL, WK, WE
Wrocław: WR, WO, WC, WW 
Zamość: ZA, ZM, ZC 
Zielona Góra: ZG, ZE, ZN

The following codes were used for special forces:
Militia/Police: MO
Military: U
Border Guard: HW
"Nadwislanskie" Troops of the Interior Ministry: HN
Foreigner plates (in green background): I
Test plates (in red background): X

Special plates:
Diplomatic: XY 12 345, The first two numbers are denoting the region of ambassador (e.g. 02 - Germany) and blue background.
Temporary: X 12 34 56, with yellow font.

2000–present 
Since the year 2000 Polish car plates have black letters pressed onto white reflective blanks with an EU stripe and country code. The switch was made to conform with other EU countries and to increase visibility. The licence plates issued until May 1, 2006, bear a Polish national flag. Plates issued after that date have the 12 EU stars instead of the flag.

See also
 European license plates

References

External links

 Reference aid for looking up Polish registrations issued between 1976-2000 (Mac OS X)
 Details about plates in Warsaw

Road transport in Poland
Poland
Poland transport-related lists
 Registration plates